The 1911 North East Cork by-election was held on 15 July 1911.  The by-election was held due to the resignation of the incumbent All-for-Ireland MP, Moreton Frewen.  Frewen resigned in order for Tim Healy, who was prominent in the All-for-Ireland League but who had been lost his seat in North Louth in the previous general election, to take his seat.  Healy was unopposed and held the seat.

References

1911 elections in Ireland
1911 elections in the United Kingdom
By-elections to the Parliament of the United Kingdom in County Cork constituencies
Unopposed by-elections to the Parliament of the United Kingdom (need citation)
July 1911 events